Château de la Faye may refer to:

 Château de la Faye (Auriac-du-Périgord)
 Château de la Faye (Deviat)
 Château de la Faye (Olmet)
 Château de la Faye (Saint-Sulpice-de-Mareuil)
 Château de la Faye (Villexavier)